Lowell Cemetery may refer to:

Lowell Cemetery (Lowell, Massachusetts)
Evergreen Cemetery (Bisbee, Arizona), also known as "Lowell Cemetery"
Lowell Cemetery (Lowell, Wisconsin)